Dolly Run is a  long 2nd order tributary to Shirley Run in Crawford County, Pennsylvania.

Variant names
According to the Geographic Names Information System, Dolly Run has also been known historically as:
Daffy Run

Course
Dolly Run rises about 0.5 miles west of Rendalls Corners, Pennsylvania, and then flows south-southeast to join Shirley Run at Cloverdale Corners.

Watershed
Dolly Run drains  of area, receives about 45.6 in/year of precipitation, has a wetness index of 438.49, and is about 46% forested.

See also
 List of rivers of Pennsylvania

References

Rivers of Pennsylvania
Rivers of Crawford County, Pennsylvania